Transmembrane protein 50A is a protein that in humans is encoded by the TMEM50A gene.

This gene is located in the RH gene locus, between the RHD and RHCE genes. The function of its protein product is unknown; however, its sequence has potential transmembrane domains suggesting that it may be an integral membrane protein. Its position between the RH genes suggests that polymorphisms in this gene may be tightly linked to RH haplotypes and may contribute to selective pressure for or against certain RH haplotypes.

Gene 

The TMEM50A gene is located on chromosome 1 p36.11 in the human (homo sapiens) genome. Its mRNA sequence is 2284 base pairs in length and includes seven exons. The coding sequence is from base pairs 151 to 624.

Protein 
The TMEM50A protein is 157 amino acids in length.

Cellular Location 

PSORT II predicts that TMEM50A is most likely found in the cells plasma membrane or the endoplasmic reticulum.

Predicted properties 

Through bioinformatic analysis several of TMEM50A's protein properties were predicted.
 Molecular Weight: 17.4 KDal
 Isoelectric point: 5.483
 Post-translational modification: Several post-translational modifications are predicted:
 Two serine phosphorylation sites found at amino acids 82 and 84 Residue
 One possibleN-Linked Glycosylation Site located at amino acid 74 
 One possible Tyrosine phosphorylation site

Structure 

The exact structure of TMEM50A is unknown but through the use of several prediction programs, some of its most likely structural components can be assumed. 
TMHMM shows that TMEM50A has four transmembrane regions. This was further confirmed by similar results found in TMEM50A orthologs and the neutral charge found in these regions using SAPS program in Biology Workbench
By using the PELE program in Biology Workbench along with comparing the results of known protein structures, it can be predicted that TMEM50A has:
Two Alpha Helix structures
Five Beta Sheets

Splice Sites 

Alternative Splice sites were found by BLAT on the UCSC genome browser

TMEM50A has several alternative splices including:
Removal of exon 2
Removal of exons 2 and 3
Removal of exons 2, 3, and 5
Removal of exon 3
Removal of exon 5

These alternative splice sites don't affect the reading frame of the sequence and thus may not alter the function of the protein.

Expression 

TMEM50A is expressed in almost all human tissues, but evidence from EST profiles through NCBI, suggests that its expression may be slightly higher in parathyroid tissues and brain tissues. It also seems to be expressed higher during the neonate and juvenile development stages.

Interacting Proteins 

There is one predicted protein that interacts with TMEM50A, C7orf43. This proteins gene is located on chromosome 7 open reading frame 43. Its function is also unknown.

Future Medical Applications

Investigation of several GEO profiles showed that TMEM50A is highly upregulated in late stage cervical cancer. This may suggest that TMEM50A has some function that may be causing or is caused directly by cervical cancer. Although few studies are available to confirm this idea, more studies may offer suggestions that use TMEM50A for treatment of late stage cervical cancer.

References

Further reading